The Orange County Review is a weekly newspaper based in Orange, Virginia owned by Berkshire Hathaway. The newspaper focuses on local community news.  Public notices from the county commissioners also appear in the newspaper.

References

Newspapers published in Virginia
Orange County, Virginia